Massimo Alioto (born in Brescia, Italy, in 1972) is an associate professor in the Department of Electrical and Computer Engineering at the National University of Singapore. He was named Fellow of the Institute of Electrical and Electronics Engineers (IEEE) in 2016, for contributions to energy-efficient VLSI circuits.

Education
Alioto received the Laurea (MSc) degree in Electronics Engineering and the Ph.D. degree in Electrical Engineering from the University of Catania (Italy) in 1997 and 2001, respectively.

References 

Fellow Members of the IEEE
Living people
1972 births
Academic staff of the National University of Singapore
Italian expatriates in Singapore
Engineers from Brescia
University of Catania alumni
Italian electrical engineers